Sultan Abu Bakar School (SMK Sultan Abu Bakar/SABS/SMKSAB) is a secondary school situated in Kuantan, Pahang, Malaysia. It is entitled as a Premier School by the Malaysian Ministry of Education due to its excellence in academic and co-curriculum. Nowadays, the Ministry of Education accepts UPSR candidates who got Sekolah Kebangsaan(SK) not less than 3A and Sekolah Jenis Kebangsaan(SJK) not less than 5A.

History 
In 1955, when Kuantan was made the state capital, a new site was chosen for the school in Jalan Beserah. Construction started in 1956. The school was officially opened on 16 August 1957 by the then Sultan of Pahang, Al-Marhum Sultan Abu Bakar Riayathuddin Al Muadzam Shah Ibni Al-Marhum Sultan Abdullah Al Muktasim Billah. Datuk Idris bin Babjee was the first principal of the school.

Motto 
Through Endeavour We Succeed, "Alah Bisa Tegal Biasa"

Gallery

Notable alumni 
 Siti Zaharah Sulaiman - former Minister
 Jamaluddin Jarjis - former Malaysian Science, Technology and Innovation Minister
 Sudirman Arshad - Malaysian singer
 Yasmin Yusoff - former Miss Malaysia
 Colin Kirton - Malaysian actor/director

References 

Secondary schools in Malaysia
Kuantan
Educational institutions established in 1957
1957 establishments in Malaya